The 2015–16 Florida State Seminoles men's basketball team, variously Florida State or FSU, represented Florida State University during the 2015–16 NCAA Division I men's basketball season. The Seminoles were led by fourteenth year head coach Leonard Hamilton and played their home games at the Donald L. Tucker Center on the university's Tallahassee, Florida campus. They were members of the Atlantic Coast Conference.

The Seminoles finished the season 20–14, 8–10 in ACC play, to finish in a tie for eleventh place. They defeated Boston College in the first round of the ACC tournament to advance to the second round where they lost to Virginia Tech. They received an invitation to the National Invitation Tournament where they defeated Davidson in the first round to advance to the second round where they lost to Valparaiso.

Previous season

Florida State finished the 2014–15 season 17–16, 8–10 in ACC play, to finish in a tie for tenth place. They lost in the quarterfinals of the ACC Tournament to top-seeded Virginia. The Seminoles missed the postseason for the first time since 2005.

Departures

Transfers

Recruits

2015 recruiting class

2016 recruiting class

Roster

Depth chart

Rankings

Schedule
Florida State was picked to finish sixth in the ACC while Xavier Rathan-Mayes was named to the preseason All-ACC team.

|-
!colspan=12 style="background:#; color:white;"| Exhibition

|-
!colspan=12 style="background:#; color:white;"| Non-conference regular season

|-
!colspan=12 style="background:#; color:white;"| ACC regular season

|-
!colspan=12 style="background:#; color:white;"| ACC tournament

|-
!colspan=12 style="background:#; color:white;"| National Invitation tournament

Awards

Watchlists
Bob Cousy Award
Xavier Rathan-Mayes
Lute Olson Award
Xavier Rathan-Mayes
Wooden Award
Xavier Rathan-Mayes
Wayman Tisdale Award
Dwayne Bacon
Malik Beasley

Honors
ACC Player of the Week
Dwayne Bacon (rookie)
Malik Beasley (rookie)
Freshman of the Week
Dwayne Bacon

All-ACC

Honorable Mention
Malik Beasley
Freshman Team
Dwayne Bacon
Malik Beasley

All-Americans
Freshman Team
Dwayne Bacon
Malik Beasley

NBA Draft
One player was selected in the 2016 NBA Draft.

Media
Florida State basketball is broadcast on the Florida State University Seminoles Radio Network.

References

External links
 Official Team Website
 Media Guide

Florida State
Florida State Seminoles men's basketball seasons
Florida State
Florida State Seminoles men's basketball
Florida State Seminoles men's basketball